I Want to Be a Star is a Toggle original series drama which is shown on Toggle. The show depicts the life of a calefare and rising to fame as actors and actresses of Mediacorp. It stars Chew Chor Meng, Shane Pow, Kym Ng, Somaline Ang, Dennis Chew, Ya Hui as the main cast of the series. Channel 8 began airing the series every Sunday at 10.30pm from 25 December 2016.

Plot
Da Tian opens a calefare agency. Edgar, Fei Mei, Gao Mei, Fa Ge, and Ru Hua all start off as extras in films. Soon, Gao Mei gets her friend Mei Yi to join. Mei Yi and Di Long fall in love. Edgar starts to fall in love with Gao Mei but it is not reciprocated.

Cast

Main cast

Other characters

See also
List of MediaCorp Channel 8 Chinese drama series (2010s)

Controversy
 A scene from episode 6 had to be removed following a public outcry of the show's casual racism. Actor Shane Pow is seen wearing an Afro wig as well as blackface make-up after a casting director fails to find an man of African descent for a role. Actor Chew Chor Meng's character had also said onscreen that Indians and Africans are "all the same."  Toggle has since apologised and removed the offensive scenes from the programme.
 A scene of episode 9 has been revealed of Jeremy Chan 's relationship with Jesseca Liu.

Episodes

Trivia 
A two part special, Star Struck (小咖大出击), features interviews with Jack Neo, Romeo Tan, Rebecca Lim, Steven Woon, Zhu Houren, Xiang Yun, Bryan Wong, Mark Lee, Chew Chor Meng and Henry Thia, was broadcast on Sunday, 10.30pm.
The show was preempted on 29 January 2017 due to Chinese New Year Special and also on 5 & 12 March 2017 due to the telecast of current affairs programme Budget N You.
The show was repeated on every Thursday at 12.30pm on Mediacorp Channel 8.

Music

References

Chinese television series